Gulbis (feminine: Gulbe) is a Latvian surname, derived from the Latvian word for "swan". Individuals with the surname include:

Laura Gulbe (born 1995), Latvian tennis player
Alvils Gulbis (1936–2021), Latvian basketball player
Ernests Gulbis (born 1988), Latvian tennis player
Evan Gulbis (born 1986), Australian cricketer
Kristaps Gulbis (born 1967), Latvian sculptor and artist 
Māris Gulbis (born 1985), Latvian basketball player
Natalie Gulbis (born 1983), American golfer of Latvian descent
Ritvars Gulbis (born 1980), Latvian curler and curling coach

Latvian-language masculine surnames